SBIC may refer to:
Small Business Investment Company
Schwarz's Bayesian information criterion
Communist Party of Brazil, or Communist Party – Brazilian Section of the Communist International, in Portuguese, (Partido Comunista), Seção Brasileira da Internacional Comunista, SBIC, as it was known from 1922 until 1962
Sociedade Brasileira de Investigação Clínica, one of the supporting agencies of the Brazilian-based English-language medical research journal Brazilian Journal of Medical and Biological Research
The International Civil Aviation Organization airport code (ICAO) four-letter code for Itacoiatiara Airport, the airport at Itacoiatiara, Amazonas, Brazil
Society of Biological Inorganic Chemistry
Sustainable Buildings Industry Council, a US-based professional association committed to encouraging sustainable architecture
Sloan Biotechnology Industry Center, one of the research centers of the University of Maryland School of Public Policy